The Bob Cummings Show (also known as Love That Bob) is an American sitcom starring Robert "Bob" Cummings which was produced from January 2, 1955 to September 15, 1959.  The episodes listed below are based on several references.

Series overview

Episodes

Season 1 (1955)

Season 2 (1955–56)

Season 3 (1956–57)

Season 4 (1957–58)

Season 5 (1958–59)

References

External links 

 

Bob Cummings Show, The